Jacob William Davis (born Jākobs Jufess; 1831–1908) was an American tailor of Latvian-Jewish origin who is credited with inventing modern jeans. Growing up in Latvia, he emigrated to the United States as a young man and spent some time in Canada as well. He invented jeans by using sturdy cloth and rivets to strengthen weak points in the seams, and partnered with Levi Strauss to mass-produce them.

Early life
Jacob Youphes was born to a Latvian-Jewish family in the city of Rīga, in 1831. During his time in Latvia, he trained and worked as a tailor.

Immigration to America
In 1854, at the age of 23, he emigrated to the United States, arriving in New York City where he changed his name to Jacob Davis.  There he ran a tailor's shop before moving to Maine and then, in 1856, San Francisco before moving on to Weaverville.

Time in Canada
After this itinerant spell in America, during which time it is believed he worked as a journeyman tailor, in 1858 Davis left California and moved to Western Canada to try to find more profitable work.  There, Davis met a German immigrant, Annie Parksher, whom he married and together, Jacob and Annie had six children.  During his time in Canada, Davis worked at the Fraser River panning for gold.

Return to America
In January 1867, Davis returned to San Francisco with Annie and his family. Later that year, they moved to Virginia City, Nevada where he sold wholesale tobacco and pork before beginning work once more as a tailor. By 1868, the family had moved, this time to Reno, Nevada which at that time was a tiny railroad town and there he helped Frederick Hertlein build a brewery. 1869 saw Davis revert to his original trade, opening a tailor shop in the main street of the town.

Tailor shop in Reno
In his tailor shop, Davis made functional items such as tents, horse blankets and wagon covers for the railway workers on the Central Pacific Railroad.  The fabric Davis worked with was heavy-duty cotton duck cloth and cotton denim which he bought from Levi Strauss & Co., a dry goods company in San Francisco. To strengthen the stress points of the sewn items he was making, Davis used copper rivets to reinforce the stitching.

The birth of jeans
In December 1870, Davis was asked by a customer to make a pair of strong working pants for her husband who was a woodcutter.  To create suitably robust pants for working, he used duck cloth and reinforced the weak points in the seams and pockets with the copper rivets.  Such was the success of these pants that word spread throughout the labourers along the railroad.  Davis was making these working pants in duck cotton and, as early as 1871, in denim cotton.  Before long, he found he could not keep up with demand.

Patent application

Davis had previously applied for patents for other inventions. Realising the potential value in his reinforced jeans concept, in 1872, he approached Levi Strauss, who was still his supplier of fabric, and asked for his financial backing in the filing of a patent application.  Strauss agreed, and on May 20, 1873, US Patent No. 139,121 for "Improvements in fastening pocket openings" was issued in the name of Jacob W. Davis and Levi Strauss and Company.   That same year, Davis started sewing a double orange threaded stitched design onto the back pocket of the jeans to distinguish them from those made by his competitors.  This trademark feature became Registered U.S. Trade Mark No. 1,139,254.

Working for Levi Strauss
By this time, Strauss had set up a sizeable tailor shop in San Francisco for the production of Davis' working pants and Jacob and his family had moved back to San Francisco for Davis to run this shop.  As demand continued to grow, the shop was superseded by a manufacturing plant which Davis managed for Strauss.  Davis continued to work there for the remainder of his life, overseeing production of the work pants as well as other lines including work shirts and overalls.

Death
Davis died in San Francisco in 1908. He is buried at Hills of Eternity Memorial Park in Colma, California.

Commemoration
In 2006 a plaque was erected in Reno, Nevada, outside the premises where Davis's tailor shop was located, to commemorate the fact jeans were invented there.

See also
 Levi Strauss
 Levi Strauss & Co.
 Ben Davis (clothing)
 Jeans

References

1831 births
1908 deaths
19th-century American inventors
Emigrants from the Russian Empire to the United States
Businesspeople from Riga
American people of Latvian-Jewish descent
American tailors
People of the California Gold Rush
Gold prospectors
People from British Columbia
Latvian inventors
19th-century American businesspeople
Burials at Hills of Eternity Memorial Park
Jeans